The Romanian Rugby Federation, abbreviated as FRR, is the governing body for the sport of rugby union in Romania. Romania currently comprises 24,610 players, 9,810 members of which are registered and 113 clubs in the whole country.

History 
The Romanian Rugby Federation was founded in 1913, shortly after rugby union was introduced to Romania by French University students who moved to study in Romania and were also one of the founding members of the Fédération Internationale de Rugby Amateur, now known as Rugby Europe.

The federation became affiliated to the International Rugby Football Board, now known as World Rugby, in 1987 when Romania were invited to take part in the inaugural World Cup the same year.

Octavian Morariu was a former president of the FRR, and was considered by many the pioneer in the reconstruction of rugby union in Romania as well as the federation itself. Due to his success, he later became the President of the Romanian Olympic and Sports Committee (COSR) and was replaced by George Straton, one of his closest associates. The current president of FRR is Alin Petrache, another former rugby union player for Romania.

Presidents

See also
 Rugby union in Romania
 Romania national rugby union team
 List of Romania national rugby union players
 Sport in Romania

References

External links
 Official website 

Rugby union in Romania
Rugby union governing bodies in Europe
World Rugby members
Rugby
Sports organizations established in 1913
1913 establishments in Romania